Yellow Odalisque is the title of two paintings by Henri Matisse which feature odalisques:

 From 1926, at the National Gallery of Canada, Ottawa; also known as Nude on a Yellow Sofa
 From 1937, at the Philadelphia Museum of Art, Philadelphia

References

1926 paintings
1937 paintings
Paintings by Henri Matisse
Paintings in the collection of the Philadelphia Museum of Art
Collections of the National Gallery of Canada